Eze Nri Ezimilo was the eleventh king of the Nri Kingdom who reigned from 1701–1723 CE after succeeding Eze Nri Apia and Nri–Alike around 1700 CE.

References

Further reading
 

Nri-Igbo
Nri monarchs
Kingdom of Nri
18th-century monarchs in Africa